Rhaxonycha is a genus of soldier beetles in the family Cantharidae. There are at least two described species in Rhaxonycha.

Species
These two species belong to the genus Rhaxonycha:
 Rhaxonycha bilobata McKey-Fender, 1941
 Rhaxonycha carolina (Fabricius, 1801) (Carolina cantharid)

References

Further reading

External links

Cantharidae
Articles created by Qbugbot